United Nations Security Council Resolution 65, adopted on December 28, 1948, requested that the consular representatives in Batavia referred to in United Nations Security Council Resolution 30 send a complete report on the situation in the Republic of Indonesia, covering the observance of ceasefire orders and the conditions prevailing in areas under military occupation or from which armed forces now in occupation may be withdrawn.

The resolution was adopted with nine votes to none; the Ukrainian SSR and Soviet Union abstained.

See also
United Nations Security Council Resolution 63
List of United Nations Security Council Resolutions 1 to 100 (1946–1953)

References
Text of the Resolution at undocs.org

External links
 

 0065
Indonesian National Revolution
 0065
 0065
1948 in Indonesia
December 1948 events